Eastphalia (Eastphalian: Oostfalen) is a historical region in northern Germany, encompassing the eastern Gaue (shires) of the historic stem duchy of Saxony, roughly confined by the River Leine in the west and the Elbe and Saale in the east. The territory corresponds with the southeastern part of the present-day states of Lower Saxony, western Saxony-Anhalt and northern Thuringia. Together with Westphalia, central Angria and Nordalbingia it was one of the four main Saxon administrative regions.

Etymology
The name Ostfalen probably means "east plain". Falen is a Germanic word meaning "flat", "level" and "plain" and is related to the Old Swedish word fala, found today in place names such as Falbygden and Falun, as well as in the northern German town of Fallstedt. The North German Plain of Eastphalia and Westphalia, divided by the Weser river, stands in contrast to the hilly region to the south, the Central Uplands of Franconia and Thuringia. Unlike the name Westphalia, which was perpetuated by the Duchy of Westphalia held by the archbishop-electors of Cologne, the name Eastphalia gradually fell out of use when the Saxon stem duchy dissolved upon the deposition of Duke Henry the Lion in 1180.

German linguists reintroduced the term in the 19th century in the course of researching the Eastphalian language as a West Low German dialect. With the rise of racial studies in the 19th and early 20th century, mention began to be made – notably by Hans F. K. Günther – of a "Phalian" subtype (fälische Rasse) of an "Aryan race" according to the occult concept of Helena Blavatsky and her Ariosophic followers.

History
With Charlemagne's defeat and baptism of Duke Widukind in 785 during the Saxon Wars, his lands were integrated into the Frankish Empire and the Saxons were increasingly converted to Christianity. The bishoprics of Halberstadt and Hildesheim were established in eastern Saxony, bounded by the Oker river, in 804 and 815 respectively. The medieval Duchy of Saxony was divided between the districts of Eastphalia (Ostfalahi), Westphalia and Engern.

The Eastphalian territory at the Harz mountain range was the hereditary lands of Henry the Fowler, the first Saxon duke to become King of the Romans in 919, and his descendants of the Ottonian dynasty. They left several Romanesque abbeys and castles, a cultural landscape that today encompasses three World Heritage Sites with the medieval town of Goslar and Quedlinburg, as well as St. Mary's Cathedral and St. Michael's Church at Hildesheim. As the Eastphalian territory bordered on the lands of the Polabian Slavs beyond the Elbe and Saale rivers, it became the starting point of the German Ostsiedlung ("settling of the East") started by the invasions of King Henry and continued by the Saxon margraves.

After the Welf duke Henry the Lion was placed under Imperial ban in 1180, Eastphalia was increasingly subdivided into smaller states, foremost the Welf Duchy of Brunswick-Lüneburg and the counties of Anhalt, Wernigerode and Blankenburg as well as the Imperial city of Goslar, but also the ecclesiastical territories of the Archbishopric of Magdeburg, the prince-bishoprics of Hildesheim and Halberstadt and Quedlinburg Abbey. The Saxon tradition was perpetuated by the Ascanian dukes of Saxe-Wittenberg, who secured for themselves the electoral dignity and later established the Electorate of Saxony on the upper Elbe.

Subdivisions
Eastphalia consisted of several Gaue. The exact list is not known for sure and differs among authorities. From North to South, the Gaue were (where available, modernized names are used): 
 Bardengau around Lüneburg (sometimes considered part of Engern, not Eastphalia) 
 Drevani (a Slavic tribe)
 Chojna (sometimes considered part of Drevani)
 Osterwalde (Salzwedel)
 Gretinge (Hohne)
 Mulbeze
 Balsamgau (Stendal)
 Flutwidde
 Astfala (Hildesheim)
 Derlingau (Evessen)
 Nordthüringgau
 Gudingau (Elze)
 Valothungo (sometimes considered part of Gudingau)
 Scotelingo (sometimes considered part of Gudingau)
 Aringo (sometimes considered part of Gudingau)
 Flenithi (sometimes considered part of Gudingau)
 Suilbergau
 Ambergau (sometimes considered part of Salzgau)
 Salzgau (Salzgitter)
 Densigau (sometimes considered part of Salzgau)
 Harzgau (Halberstadt)
 Schwabengau
 Hassegau (Mansfeld)
 Friesenfeld (sometimes considered part of Hassegau)

References 

Regions of Lower Saxony
Regions of Saxony-Anhalt
History of Brunswick
Geography of Braunschweig
Old Saxony
Historical regions